KNJO-LP was a fully automated low-power television station serving Holbrook, Arizona, as an America One affiliate. It provided over-the-air service in analog on VHF channel 6 from its transmitter about 5 miles (8 km) south-southwest of downtown Holbrook and had a construction permit to build a digital television station on UHF channel 15. KNJO-LP was owned by KM Communications of Skokie, Illinois.

History
An original construction permit for a low-power television station on channel 6 was granted to KM Communications on October 17, 2002. The original callsign was K06NL, but KM Communications soon changed it to KNJO-LP for Navajo County, of which Holbrook is the county seat. The station was licensed on October 28, 2005 as Holbrook's second local over-the-air television station.

KNJO went off the air on April 27, 2012 due to vandalism that damaged its equipment, and economic factors that prevented repairs; it never returned to the air, and the license was canceled on June 19, 2013.

Digital television
In June 2006, the FCC opened a window for low-power television stations to file short-form applications for digital companion channels for the DTV transition. km Communications applied for UHF channel 15 for KNJO-LD on June 30, 2006 and on January 12, 2007, the FCC granted a construction permit to build the station, to expire in three years.

References

NJO-LP
Holbrook, Arizona
Mass media in Navajo County, Arizona
Defunct television stations in the United States
Television channels and stations established in 2005
2005 establishments in Arizona
Television channels and stations disestablished in 2012
2012 disestablishments in Arizona
NJO-LP
Television networks in the United States